Brookdale Community College is a public community college in the Lincroft section of Middletown Township, in Monmouth County, New Jersey, New Jersey, United States. Founded in 1967, the college also has regional locations in Neptune Township, Freehold Township, Long Branch, and Wall Township.

Brookdale is an open-admission college that admits anyone 18 years of age or older or anyone who is a high school graduate or holder of an equivalency diploma. The college also offers courses to qualified high school students through its dual enrollment program. It serves the residents of Monmouth County and surrounding communities and has an enrollment of approximately 10,000 students. The college offers associate degrees in more than 75 programs, as well as non-degree/non-credit classes and certificate programs.

History
In 1967, the Monmouth County Board of Chosen Freeholders decided to form a community college for the benefit of Monmouth county residents. For this purpose, the 800-acre Brookdale Farm in Lincroft was acquired from Lewis S. Thompson Jr. in 1968. Classes were first offered in 1969.

On July 24, 2012, College President Peter F. Burnham, who had retired from a 20-year tenure after corruption allegations surfaced pleaded guilty to two indictable (felony) counts of official misconduct and one count of theft by deception in a plea agreement that called for a five-year prison term. Five months later, he was sentenced to a 5-year-prison-term and ordered to make financial restitution to the college.

The college announced on October 5, 2022 that its Hazlet campus had been sold and that the college would seek to open a new branch campus in the region.

Lincroft campus

The Lincroft campus in Middletown consists of 22 buildings, including the Center for the Visual Arts, the Center for World War II Studies, and the Donald D. Warner Student Life Center. The newly renovated Robert J. Collins Arena/Brookdale Recreation and Events Center holds special events, including conventions, concerts, and athletic competitions.

High Technology High School, a magnet school for students from Monmouth County, is located near the eastern edge of the Lincroft Campus. It is operated by the Monmouth County Vocational School District.

The Lincroft campus is home to the Monmouth Museum, the Brookdale Performing Arts Center, and Brookdale Public Radio (WBJB-FM). These institutions offer performances, National Public Radio programming, and music.

Athletics
The Department of Athletics, Recreation, and Intramurals provides a diverse range of programs. Brookdale's intercollegiate program is nationally recognized. The Jersey Blues teams compete in the Garden State Athletic Conference and in Region XIX of the National Junior College Athletic Association. The program has won eight NJCAA Division III National titles: softball (2002, 2005 and 2010), women's soccer (2013, 2014 and 2015) and men's basketball (2013 and 2018).

Sports teams
 Men's and Women's Cross Country
 Men's and Women's Soccer
 Men's and Women's Tennis
 Men's and Women's Basketball
 Men's Lacrosse
 Baseball
 Softball
 Cheerleading
 Women's Volleyball

Student clubs and organizations
There are approximately 50 recognized student organizations at Brookdale Community College. Clubs and organizations are recognized by the Student Life Board, Brookdale's student government, and must re-register every year with the department of Student Life and Activities.

Coastal Communiversity and university partnerships
The NJ Coastal Communiversity, led by Brookdale, was an alliance of New Jersey higher education colleges and universities offering selected associate, bachelor's, and master's degrees, and graduate certificates in Monmouth County.Its members were Brookdale, Georgian Court University, Montclair State University, New Jersey City University, the New Jersey Institute of Technology, and Rutgers, the State University of New Jersey. Classes and services were offered at Brookdale's Wall Higher Education Center (on the grounds of the former US Army installation Camp Evans). Rutgers classes and services were offered at the Western Monmouth Branch Campus in Freehold and Montclair's MBA classes were offered on the Lincroft main campus.

As of 2021, the Communiversity had been replaced by institutional partnerships with Georgian Court University, New Jersey City University, and Rutgers University.

Center for World War II Studies and Conflict Resolution
The Center for World War II Studies and Conflict Resolution is dedicated to fostering the study of the historical, political, social, economic, cultural and military aspects of the World War II era up through the Korean War. The Center examines the key events of the time; the political and military leaders who waged the wars, provided the leadership, made the peace; and those who served on the battlefield and home front.

Notable people

Faculty and staff

 Monica Aksamit (born 1990), saber fencer who won a bronze medal at the 2016 Summer Olympics in the Women's Saber Team competition.
 Jeffrey Ford (born 1955), fantasy, science fiction and mystery author, who is a recipient of the Edgar Allan Poe Award, the Nebula Award and the World Fantasy Award
 Laura McCullough (born 1960), author and poet.
 Sally Priesand (born 1946), America's first female rabbi. She serves on the board of the Center for Holocaust Studies at Brookdale.
 Dan Tomasulo (born 1951), counseling psychologist, author, and professor.
 Pat Villani (1954–2011), computer programmer, author, and advocate of free software.
 William John Watkins (born 1942), science fiction writer and Rhysling award-winning poet.

Alumni

 Lou Brutus (born 1972), radio host, musician and photographer.
 Deena Nicole Cortese (born 1987), cast member on the reality shows Jersey Shore and Jersey Shore: Family Vacation.
 Dean Ehehalt (born 1964), head coach of the Monmouth Hawks baseball team.
 Bill Hill (born 1959), former NFL cornerback for the Dallas Cowboys
 Jim Hunter (born 1959), formerly of CBS Sports and currently a broadcaster on the Mid-Atlantic Sports Network that covers the Major League Baseball's Baltimore Orioles.
 Rob Lukachyk (born 1968), former Major League Baseball player who played briefly for the Montreal Expos during their 1996 season.
 John Montefusco (born 1950), former Major League Baseball pitcher from 1974 to 1986 who played for the San Francisco Giants, Atlanta Braves, San Diego Padres and New York Yankees.
 Nicole “Snooki” Polizzi (LaValle) (born 1987), Reality-TV star of Jersey Shore, Dancing With the Stars, Celebrity Apprentice, Fear Factor, Snooki & JWoww, Nicole & Jionni's Shore Flip, & Jersey Shore: Family Vacation.
 Dave Rible (born 1967), Director of the New Jersey Division of Alcoholic Beverage Control, who previously served in the New Jersey General Assembly.
 Alex Skuby (born 1972), actor best known for appearing on King of Queens.
 Kevin Smith (born 1970), film director, screenwriter, and actor, perhaps best known for the cult classic Clerks. Brookdale's Criminal Justice degree program was mentioned during the jail scene in his film Clerks 2. He received an Associate of Letters degree in 2007.
 Mike “The Situation” Sorrentino (born 1982), Reality-TV star of Jersey Shore, Dancing With the Stars, Celebrity Big Brother (UK), The Sorrentinos, Marriage Boot Camp, and Jersey Shore: Family Vacation
 James Urbaniak (born 1963), actor of film, stage, and voice. Portrays Dr. Venture, amongst other characters, on The Venture Brothers.
 Denny Walling (born 1954), Major League Baseball third baseman for the Houston Astros.
 Brian Williams (born 1959), former anchor and managing editor of NBC Nightly News.
 Madlyn-Ann C. Woolwich (born 1937), pastel and impressionist painter and author of several books and articles.

See also

 List of New Jersey County Colleges

References

External links

 Official website

 
Universities and colleges in Monmouth County, New Jersey
New Jersey County Colleges
NJCAA athletics
1967 establishments in New Jersey
Middletown Township, New Jersey
Educational institutions established in 1967